Da Hoss (January 18, 1992 – January 2, 2022) was a champion Thoroughbred gelding best known for winning the Breeders' Cup Mile two times.

Background
He was bred in Kentucky by Fares Farms and originally owned by Prestonwood Farm as well as Wallstreet Racing Stables. 

Da Hoss was purchased for $6,000 as a yearling at the Keeneland Sales, by Kevin Eikleberry and Clifford Thygesen, bringing the lowest price for a Gone West yearling for all of 1993.  The horse had physical problems, bone spurs in his hocks, and a previously infected hoof that had rotted away part of his coffin bone.  After being purchased, and determined to be healthy enough to attempt a racing career, Da Hoss was taken to Turf Paradise in Phoenix, Arizona.

Racing career

1994–1996: Early career
Da Hoss was undefeated in his two-year-old season, consisting of three starts.  After winning his first race, at Turf Paradise, by one length, he followed that effort with an allowance score before concluding his first season on the racetrack with a stakes win, the ATBA Sales Stakes, where he completed the six-furlong distance in a then-record time of 1:07 1/5.

In his first start at three, Da Hoss took the Grade III 'Best Turn Stakes (now known as the Jimmy Winkfield Stakes), the Grade II Jersey Derby, and the Grade II Del Mar Derby, and came second in the Grade II Gotham Stakes, Illinois Stakes, Swaps Stakes, and Pegasus Stakes in addition to winning another allowance.  The horse he finished second to in the GII Swaps Stakes was that year's Kentucky Derby and Belmont winner, Thunder Gulch.  He also ran third in the G1 Crown Royal Hollywood Derby.  In his first Breeders’ Cup appearance, the 1995 Breeders’ Cup Sprint on dirt, Da Hoss finished 13th; it was the only time in his 20-race career that he failed to hit the board.

1996 began with a third place finish in the Poker Handicap at Belmont Park, and Da Hoss found himself in the winner's circle again in his next start, the G3 Fourstardave Handicap.  Next was a win in the Pennsylvania Governor's Cup Handicap, then a second in the Kelso Handicap, before entering the starting gate at Woodbine for the 1996 Breeders’ Cup Mile under jockey Gary Stevens.  Da Hoss won by one and a half lengths to the call of "it's da American, Da Hoss, in da Mile!"

Da Hoss did not race again for 715 days.

1998: Comeback
Da Hoss' physical problems kept him out of the starting gate for nearly two years.  Each time they put him back into serious training, Dickinson said, the competitive animal would try too hard and overexert himself, causing an injury to flare up and putting him back on the sidelines. Dickinson was determined to get the horse back to the Breeders’ Cup, but by the fall of 1998, he was running out of time.  There was time for only one prep race for the 1998 Mile, which was an allowance event at Colonial Downs written specifically to get the horse in a race. After Da Hoss won by three parts of a length, Dickinson entered him in the 1998 Breeders’ Cup Mile.  It is likely the horse would have been refused entry had he not won the race previously, as the committee wanted to avoid another incident like Ricks Natural Star. Dickinson wanted Gary Stevens to ride Da Hoss, but the jockey's agent had committed him to another horse.  John Velazquez ultimately took the mount, and Dickinson challenged Stevens' agent, Ron Anderson, to a $1,000 personal bet as to who would finish in front of the other - Da Hoss or Among Men, who Anderson had put Stevens on for the race.

After a delayed start caused by several horses not wanting to load in the starting gate, Da Hoss settled in sixth in the early stages of the race, allowing the speed horses to battle it out in front of him, and was among those closing in on Favorite Trick heading to the final straight. Da Hoss neared the front at the top of the stretch, to the surprised call of "Da Hoss is in with a chance on the outside!"  Surging to the lead, Da Hoss was approached in the stretch to his outside by Hawksley Hill, who took over the lead by a nose nearing the finish.  With no one challenging from behind, it seemed that Da Hoss would finish second, which still likely would have earned the respect of many who didn't think he belonged in the race, but the same competitiveness that had prolonged his comeback finally worked to the gelding's benefit.  Da Hoss gained back the ground lost and put his nose back in front just before the wire to take his second Breeders' Cup.  Announcer Tom Durkin yelled, "Oh, my, this is the greatest comeback since Lazarus! He's had one race in two years!" Twenty years later, Catholic Boy re-rallying in two races to defeat Analyze It stirred up memories of Da Hoss' famous win in the 1998 Mile.

The 1998 Mile was Da Hoss' final race. In his twenty starts, he won 12 races, placed in 5 others, and came home third twice. His career earnings amounted to $1,931,558, nearly $3.1 million dollars adjusted for inflation.

Until Ouija Board took her second non-consecutive Breeders' Cup win in 2006, Da Hoss was one of only six horses to ever win two Breeders' Cup races and the only one to win in non-consecutive years.

Retirement

Da Hoss lived out his days at the Kentucky Horse Park in the Hall of Champions, in Lexington, Kentucky. He was retired from showing after the 2020 season. He died on January 2, 2022, at the official age of 30, as all Northern Hemisphere born Thoroughbreds turn a year older on January 1.

Race Record

References

 Da Hoss bio
 A site devoted to Da Hoss

1992 racehorse births
2022 racehorse deaths
Racehorses bred in Kentucky
Racehorses trained in the United States
Breeders' Cup Mile winners
Thoroughbred family 16-c